Richland is an unincorporated community in western Richland Township, Rush County, Indiana, United States. It lies along State Road 244, south of the city of Rushville, the county seat of Rush County.  Its elevation is 1,027 feet (313 m), and it is located at  (39.4975485, -85.3949681).

History
Richland was platted in 1854. The community took its name from Richland Township.

A post office was established at Richland in 1827, and remained in operation until it was discontinued in 1903.

References

Unincorporated communities in Rush County, Indiana
Unincorporated communities in Indiana